Puppet Master or Puppetmaster may refer to:

 A puppeteer

Films
 Puppet Master (film series), a series of horror films
 Puppet Master (film), the 1989 film that started the franchise
 The Puppetmaster (film), a 1993 Taiwanese film
 The Puppet Masters (film), a 1994 film based on Robert A. Heinlein’s 1951 novel of the same title

Literature
 Puppet Master (Action Lab Comics), a comic book series written by Shawn Gabborin and published monthly by Action Lab Comics
 Puppet Master (Eternity Comics), a limited comic book series based on the films
 Puppet Master (Marvel Comics), a Marvel Comics villain
 The Puppet Masters, a science fiction novel by Robert A. Heinlein
 The Puppet-Masters, a 1969 novel by William Garner
 The Master Puppeteer, 1975 novel
 Puppeteer (comics), a DC Comics villain formerly called Puppet Master

Music
 The Puppet Master (album) (2003), King Diamond's eleventh album
 Master of Puppets, a 1986 heavy metal album by Metallica
 "Master of Puppets" (song), title track of the album
 "Puppet Master", a song by Soul Assassins featuring B-Real and Dr. Dre from the 1997 album Soul Assassins, Chapter 1
 The Puppeteer, provisional title to the 2006 album Kelis Was Here
 "Puppet Master", a song by Crooked I featuring RZA, King, and The Observer from the 2016 album Good vs. Evil
"Puppet Master", a song by Thy Art Is Murder from the 2017 album Dear Desolation

Television
 "Puppet Master" (Glee)
 "The Puppetmaster" (Avatar: The Last Airbender)
 "Puppet Master" (Fantastic Four episode)
 Puppet Master (Ghost in the Shell), a hacker in Ghost in the Shell whose code name is Project 2501
 The Puppet Master: Hunting the Ultimate Conman, a 2022 Netflix documentary miniseries about convicted conman Robert Hendy-Freegard

Video games
 Puppet Master, a job class in the game Final Fantasy XI
 Puppet Master (gaming), a person running an online game or creating puzzles based on fictional characters in an alternative reality

See also
 Puppeteer (disambiguation)